Stop the Music may refer to:

Radio and television
Stop the Music (American game show), 1948 radio quiz show and later TV series
Stop the Music (Australian TV series), a 1956 Australian music-based game show TV series

Music
 Stop the Music (album), a 2002 album by New Breed, or the title song

Songs

 "Stop the Music", a 1948 song written by Babe Russin and Jack Hoffman
 "Stop the Music", a 1962 song and single by The Shirelles, Denson
 "Stop the Music", a 1964 song by The Chartbusters, B-side of "Why (Doncha Be My Girl)" 
 "Stop the Music", a 1965 song and single by The Hitmakers
 "Stop the Music", a 1966 song by Elkie Brooks, B-side of "Baby Let Me Love You"
 "Stop the Music", a 2010 song and single by The Pipettes from Earth vs. The Pipettes
 "Stop the Music" (P-Money song), a 2004 song by P-Money

Other uses
Stop The Music (horse), an American racehorse

See also
Don't Stop the Music (disambiguation)